Mount Gargash is located in Isfahan Province, 30 km South Kashan in Iran near the towns of Kamu and Choghan. The peak was chosen as the outcome of a site selection campaign for the national observatory project in 2008, and is known for its low atmospheric turbulence thus suitable for astronomical observations. Mount Gargash is located in a protected zone for the conservation of its wildlife. A dedicated road opened to access the mountain in 2016.

References 

Mountains of Iran
Mountains of Isfahan Province